Glenn A. Donnelson was a member of the Utah House of Representatives. While in office he was the sponsor of a 2007 bill that made it so people without legal residency in the United States could not be granted in-state tuition at educational institutions in Utah.

Sources
Vote Smart report on bill sponsored by Donnelson

Members of the Utah House of Representatives
Living people
Year of birth missing (living people)
Place of birth missing (living people)
21st-century American politicians